Hollandaea porphyrocarpa is a species of small Australian rainforest tree in the plant family Proteaceae. It is endemic to restricted areas of the rainforests of the Wet Tropics region of northeastern Queensland.

Hollandaea porphyrocarpa was recognised by botanical science only as recently as the 1990s and formally scientifically described in 2012 by botanists Andrew Ford and Peter Weston. Around the early 1990s the trees were recognised only in a restricted area in the mountains west and north west of Mossman, Queensland. They may grow naturally only in the restricted mountains areas reported, further field work will clarify this.

The authorities of this species 2012 naming, Andrew Ford and Peter Weston, recommend for the very restricted and small known population of these trees, the conservation status of vulnerable according to the International Union for Conservation of Nature (IUCN) criteria, "under categories VU, D1 and D2".

References

Proteaceae
Flora of Queensland